Erik Čaládi (born 1 April 1988) is a Slovak former professional ice hockey center.

Career
Čaládi began his career with HK Nitra, playing three games for the team during 2004–05 season. In 2006, he played in the Ontario Hockey League for the Belleville Bulls but would return to Nitra the following year. He remained with Nitra until 2012 when he moved to France to sign for FFHG Division 1 side LHC Les Lions.

Čaládi signed for HC Nové Zámky of the MOL Liga. He stayed for four seasons before moving to HK Poprad on May 4, 2017. However, he never played for the team and he instead signed for UTE of MOL Liga. On April 29, 2018, Čaládi returned to HK Nitra.

References

External links

1988 births
Living people
Belleville Bulls players
HK Levice players
LHC Les Lions players
HK Nitra players
HC Nové Zámky players
ŠHK 37 Piešťany players
Slovak ice hockey right wingers
Sportspeople from Nitra
Újpesti TE (ice hockey) players
Slovak expatriate ice hockey players in Canada
Slovak expatriate sportspeople in France
Slovak expatriate sportspeople in Hungary
Expatriate ice hockey players in France
Expatriate ice hockey players in Hungary